Ranburne is a town in Cleburne County, Alabama, United States. At the 2020 census, the population was 422.

Geography

Demographics

As of the census of 2000, there were 459 people, 186 households, and 137 families residing in the town. The racial makeup of the town was 100.00% White. 0.00% of the population were Hispanic or Latino of any race.

There were 186 households, out of which 31.7% had children under the age of 18 living with them, 65.1% were married couples living together, 5.4% had a female householder with no husband present, and 26.3% were non-families. 24.2% of all households were made up of individuals, and 12.4% had someone living alone who was 65 years of age or older. The average household size was 2.47 and the average family size was 2.91.

In the town, the population was spread out, with 23.5% under the age of 18, 6.1% from 18 to 24, 29.0% from 25 to 44, 24.8% from 45 to 64, and 16.6% who were 65 years of age or older. The median age was 38 years. For every 100 females, there were 95.3 males. For every 100 females age 18 and over, there were 93.9 males.

The median income for a household in the town was $31,979, and the median income for a family was $40,250. Males had a median income of $29,167 versus $20,000 for females. The per capita income for the town was $19,708. About 5.6% of families and 7.1% of the population were below the poverty line, including 3.8% of those under age 18 and 17.3% of those age 65 or over.

Notable people
Chase Whitley, MLB Free Agent pitcher
Ben Buchanan, Currently signed to WWE where he performs on the NXT brand under the ring name Brooks Jensen.

Gallery

See also

 List of towns in Alabama

References

External links

 Ranburne High School

Towns in Cleburne County, Alabama
Towns in Alabama